A.C. Milan Superleague Formula team was a racing team representing Italian football club A.C. Milan in Superleague Formula.

2008 season
In the 2008 Superleague Formula season A.C. Milan hired the services of ex Formula One driver Robert Doornbos. Robert won 2 races and A.C. Milan finished 3rd overall in the standings. Doornbos did not return to the series in 2009. He now drives in the IndyCar Series.

2009 season
A.C. Milan returned for the 2009 Superleague Formula season with former Formula One racer and current GP2 Series champion Giorgio Pantano. In having Pantano as their driver, A.C. Milan are the first Superleague Formula team in history to have had two Formula One drivers to drive their car. In Giorgio's first round for A.C. Milan he had gearbox problems in qualifying, putting him 16th on grid for the first race. A.C. Milan won the 2nd race of the opening round of the season.

2010 season
Yelmer Buurman will be the driver of the ATECH Grand Prix run team for the 2010 season.

Record
(key)

2008

2009
Super Final results in 2009 did not count for points towards the main championship.

2010

References

External links
 A.C. Milan Superleague Formula team minisite
 Official A.C. Milan football club website

A.C. Milan
Superleague Formula club teams
2008 establishments in Italy